A geographical indication (GI) is a name or sign used on certain products which corresponds to a specific geographical location or origin (e.g., a town, region, or country). India, as a member of the World Trade Organization (WTO), enacted the Geographical Indications of Goods (Registration and Protection) Act, 1999 has come into force with effect from 15 September 2003. GIs have been defined under Article 22 (1) of the WTO Agreement on Trade-Related Aspects of Intellectual Property Rights (TRIPS) Agreement as: "Indications which identify a good as originating in the territory of a member, or a region or a locality in that territory, where a given quality, reputation or characteristic of the good is essentially attributable to its geographic origin."

The GI tag ensures that none other than those registered as authorised users (or at least those residing inside the geographic territory) are allowed to use the popular product name. Darjeeling tea became the first GI tagged product in India, in 20042005. These are listed below.

Registered geographical indications 

Following is the list of registered geographical indications in India:

See also
Make in India

References

External links 
 Registered GI

Indian intellectual property law
 
Indian folk art